The 1944–45 St. John's Redmen basketball team represented St. John's College of Brooklyn during the 1944–45 NCAA Division I college basketball season. The team was coached by Joseph Lapchick in his ninth year at the school. St. John's home games were played at DeGray Gymnasium in Brooklyn and the old Madison Square Garden in Manhattan.

Roster

Schedule and results

|-
!colspan=9 style="background:#FF0000; color:#FFFFFF;"| Regular Season

|-
!colspan=9 style="background:#FF0000; color:#FFFFFF;"| NIT

References

St. John's Red Storm men's basketball seasons
St. John's
St. John's
St Johns
St Johns